Hourya Sinaceur is a Moroccan philosopher.  She is an expert in the theory and history of mathematics.

Biography
Hourya Benis was born in 1940 in Casablanca in Morocco. Sinaceur worked for Paris-Sorbonne University and the French National Centre for Scientific Research which is also in Paris, and the URS in Rabat. She has also served as a member of the National French Committee of History and Philosophy of Science (Comité National Francais d'Histoire et de Philosophie des Sciences.

Books
She is the author of the book Corps et Modèles (1991), translated into English as Field and Models: From Sturm to Tarski and Robinson (Birkhauser, 2003). and of Functions and Generality of Logic: Reflections on Dedekind's and Frege's logicisms (Springer, 2015).

References

External links
Sinaceur, H., 2001. "Alfred Tarski: Semantic shift, heuristic shift in metamathematics", Synthese 126: 49–65.
"Alfred Tarski Life and Logic", Review by Sinaceur 
 Presentation (in French) and bibliography of recent work on IHPST  (retrieved on Feb. 22, 2009)

Academic staff of the University of Paris
Moroccan writers
Moroccan philosophers
Moroccan academics
Living people
People from Casablanca
Year of birth missing (living people)
Moroccan women philosophers
Women mathematicians
Philosophers of science
Moroccan women writers
Academic staff of Paris-Sorbonne University